Psychrobacter cibarius is a Gram-negative, nonmotile bacterium of the genus Psychrobacter, which was isolated from jeotgal in Korea.

References

External links
Type strain of Psychrobacter cibarius at BacDive -  the Bacterial Diversity Metadatabase
 	

Moraxellaceae
Bacteria described in 2005